Minendra Rijal is a Nepali politician and former Defence Minister of Nepal. He is also member of the House of Representatives.

Political career 
He is a former member of Nepali Congress party Central Working Committee. He served as Minister of Information and Communications during the prime minister-ship of the Sushil Koirala. 

Recently, Rijal resigned as Defence minister after he was unable to win internal election of party for general secretary.

He was elected to parliament from Morang-2 in the 2017 elections. Morang-2 is the constituency from where Late PM Girija Prasad Koirala used to contest the election.

He was also one of the architects of the mixed electoral system that ensured better social and gender diversity in the Constituent Assembly.

Electoral history

2017 legislative elections

References

Nepali Congress politicians from Koshi Province
Government ministers of Nepal
Living people
Place of birth missing (living people)
1957 births
Nepali Congress (Democratic) politicians
Nepal MPs 2017–2022
People from Dharan
Members of the 2nd Nepalese Constituent Assembly